Bilangbilangan is a small island in the Philippines, located in Cebu Strait, a body of water between the islands of Bohol and Cebu. The island is locally administered by Barangay Bilangbilangan, which is under the jurisdiction of the municipality of Tubigon, Bohol. Bilangbilangan is one of the string of islands located in the Danajon Bank, the only double barrier reef in the Philippines, which is known to be rich in marine resources. Residents in the island are fisherfolks that supply seafoods to the markets in nearby Metro Cebu. With an area of around only  and a population of 471, Bilangbilangan has a very high population density, one of the densest populated islands in the country.

There is another island off the coast in the town of Bien Unido in the eastern side of Bohol, which is similarly named Bilangbilangan.  People refer this island as Bilangbilangan East to distinguish it from the island in Tubigon.

Education
The island has one public school, Bilangbilangan Elementary School.

Utilities

Electricity

A diesel power plant provides electricity in Bilangbilangan. The facility is operated by the National Power Corporation - Small Power Utilities Group.

Current threats
Aside from strong typhoons that threat the island and the rest of the Philippines, the island seems to have submerged after the 7.2 magnitude 2013 Bohol Earthquake in October, 2013. The earthquake caused the lowering of the ground surface, known as ground subsidence or settling. Because of this, plus the effects of climate change, during high tide, seawater floods the whole island of Bilangbilangan. This extreme sea level rise has greatly impacted the people of the island. The nearby islands, such as Ubay Island, Pangapasan and Batasan have also experienced the same tribulation. Eventhough, the government has offered a relocation program, but the locals don't want to leave and have chosen to stay in the island since their way of life depends on fishing.

Transport
There are no regular or scheduled trips to Bilangbilangan, however there are available chartered motorized bangkas that travel between the port of Tubigon and Bilangbilangan. The island can also be directly reached by bangka docked in Pasil Fish Port in Cebu City.

Sea also
 List of islands by population density

References 

Islands of Bohol